was the fourteenth of the sixty-nine stations of the Nakasendō. It is located in the present-day city of Annaka, Gunma Prefecture, Japan. Ruins of its honjin can be found at the Princess Kazunomiya Inn (皇女和宮宿泊 Ōjo Kazunomiya Shukuhaku).

Neighboring Post Towns
Nakasendō
Takasaki-shuku - Itahana-shuku - Annaka-shuku

References

Stations of the Nakasendō
Post stations in Gunma Prefecture